Tiberius Claudius Caesar Augustus Germanicus (1 August 10 BC – 13 October AD 54) was the fourth  Roman emperor, ruling from AD 41 to 54. A member of the Julio-Claudian dynasty, Claudius was born to Drusus and Antonia Minor at Lugdunum in Roman Gaul, where his father was stationed as a military legate. He was the first Roman emperor to be born outside Italy. Nonetheless, Claudius was an Italian of Sabine origins.

As he had a limp and slight deafness due to sickness at a young age, he was ostracized by his family and was excluded from public office until his consulship (which was shared with his nephew, Caligula, in 37). Claudius's infirmity probably saved him from the fate of many other nobles during the purges throughout the reigns of Tiberius and Caligula, as potential enemies did not see him as a serious threat. His survival led to him being declared emperor by the Praetorian Guard after Caligula's assassination, at which point he was the last adult male of his family.

Despite his lack of experience, Claudius was an able and efficient administrator. He expanded the imperial bureaucracy to include freedmen, and helped  restore the empire's finances after the excesses of Caligula's reign. He was also an ambitious builder, constructing new roads, aqueducts, and canals across the Empire. During his reign the Empire started its successful conquest of Britain. Having a personal interest in law, he presided at public trials, and issued edicts daily. He was seen as vulnerable throughout his reign, particularly by elements of the nobility. Claudius was constantly forced to shore up his position, which resulted in the deaths of many senators. Those events damaged his reputation among the ancient writers, though more recent historians have revised that opinion. Many authors contend that he was murdered by his own wife, Agrippina the Younger. After his death at the age of 63, his grand-nephew and legally adopted step-son, Nero, succeeded him as emperor.

Family and youth

Early life 

Claudius was born on 1 August 10 BC at Lugdunum (modern Lyon, France). He had two older siblings, Germanicus and Livilla. His mother, Antonia Minor, may have had two other children who died young. Claudius's maternal grandparents were Mark Antony and Octavia Minor, Augustus's sister, and he was therefore the great-great-grandnephew of Gaius Julius Caesar. His paternal grandparents were Livia, Augustus's third wife, and Tiberius Claudius Nero. During his reign, Claudius revived the rumor that his father Nero Claudius Drusus was actually the illegitimate son of Augustus, to give the appearance that Augustus was Claudius's paternal grandfather.

In 9 BC, Claudius's father Drusus died on campaign in Germania from a fall from a horse. Claudius was then raised by his mother, who never remarried. When his disability became evident, the relationship with his family turned sour. Antonia referred to him as a monster, and used him as a standard for stupidity. She seems to have passed her son off to his grandmother Livia for a number of years.

Livia was a little kinder, but nevertheless sent Claudius short, angry letters of reproof. He was put under the care of a "former mule-driver" to keep him disciplined, under the logic that his condition was due to laziness and a lack of willpower. However, by the time he reached his teenage years, his symptoms apparently waned and his family began to take some notice of his scholarly interests.

In AD 7, Livy was hired to tutor Claudius in history, with the assistance of Sulpicius Flavus. He spent a lot of his time with the latter, as well as the philosopher Athenodorus. Augustus, according to a letter, was surprised at the clarity of Claudius's oratory.

Public life 

Claudius' work as a historian damaged his prospects for advancement in public life. According to Vincent Scramuzza and others, he began work on a history of the Civil Wars that was either too truthful or too critical of Octavian, then reigning as Caesar Augustus. In either case, it was far too early for such an account, and may have only served to remind Augustus that Claudius was Antony's descendant. His mother and grandmother quickly put a stop to it, and this may have convinced them that Claudius was not fit for public office, since he could not be trusted to toe the existing party line.

When Claudius returned to the narrative later in life, he skipped over the wars of the Second Triumvirate altogether; but the damage was done, and his family pushed him into the background. When the Arch of Pavia was erected to honor the Imperial clan in AD 8, Claudius's name (now Tiberius Claudius Nero Germanicus after his elevation to pater familias of the Claudii Nerones on the adoption of his brother) was inscribed on the edge, past the deceased princes, Gaius and Lucius, and Germanicus's children. There is some speculation that the inscription was added by Claudius himself decades later, and that he originally did not appear at all.

When Augustus died in AD 14, Claudius – then aged 23 – appealed to his uncle Tiberius to allow him to begin the cursus honorum. Tiberius, the new Emperor, responded by granting Claudius consular ornaments. Claudius requested office once more and was snubbed. Since the new emperor was no more generous than the old, Claudius gave up hope of public office and retired to a scholarly, private life.

Despite the disdain of the Imperial family, it seems that from very early on the general public respected Claudius. At Augustus's death, the equites, or knights, chose Claudius to head their delegation. When his house burned down, the Senate demanded it be rebuilt at public expense. They also requested that Claudius be allowed to debate in the Senate. Tiberius turned down both motions, but the sentiment remained.

During the period immediately after the death of Tiberius's son, Drusus, Claudius was pushed by some quarters as a potential heir. This again suggests the political nature of his exclusion from public life. However, as this was also the period during which the power and terror of the commander of the Praetorian Guard, Sejanus, was at its peak, Claudius chose to downplay this possibility. After the death of Tiberius, the new emperor Caligula (the son of Claudius's brother Germanicus) recognized Claudius to be of some use. He appointed Claudius his co-consul in 37 to emphasize the memory of Caligula's deceased father Germanicus.

Despite this, Caligula tormented his uncle: playing practical jokes, charging him enormous sums of money, humiliating him before the Senate, and the like. According to Cassius Dio, Claudius became sickly and thin by the end of Caligula's reign, most likely due to stress. A possible surviving portrait of Claudius from this period may support this.

Assassination of Caligula (AD 41)

On 24 January 41, Caligula was assassinated in a conspiracy involving Cassius Chaerea – a military tribune in the Praetorian Guard – and several senators. There is no evidence that Claudius had a direct hand in the assassination, although it has been argued that he knew about the plot – particularly since he left the scene of the crime shortly before his nephew was murdered. However, after the deaths of Caligula's wife and daughter, it became apparent that Cassius intended to go beyond the terms of the conspiracy and wipe out the Imperial family.

In the chaos following the murder, Claudius witnessed the German guard cut down several uninvolved noblemen, including many of his friends. He fled to the palace to hide. According to tradition, a Praetorian named Gratus found him hiding behind a curtain and suddenly declared him princeps. A section of the guard may have planned in advance to seek out Claudius, perhaps with his approval. They reassured him that they were not one of the battalions looking for revenge. He was spirited away to the Praetorian camp and put under their protection.

The Senate  met and debated a change of government, but this devolved into an argument over which of them would be the new princeps. When they heard of the Praetorians' claim, they demanded that Claudius be delivered to them for approval, but he refused, sensing the danger that would come with complying. Some historians, particularly Josephus, claim that Claudius was directed in his actions by the Judaean King Herod Agrippa. However, an earlier version of events by the same ancient author downplays Agrippa's role so it remains uncertain. Eventually the Senate was forced to give in. In return, Claudius granted a general amnesty, although he executed a few junior officers involved in the conspiracy. The actual assassins, including Cassius Chaerea and Julius Lupus, the murderer of Caligula's wife and daughter, were put to death to ensure Claudius's own safety and as a future deterrent.

As Emperor

Claudius took several steps to legitimize his rule against potential usurpers, most of them emphasizing his place within the Julio-Claudian family. He adopted the name "Caesar" as a cognomen, as the name still carried great weight with the populace. To do so, he dropped the cognomen "Nero", which he had adopted as pater familias of the Claudii Nerones when his brother Germanicus was adopted out. As Pharaoh of Egypt, Claudius adopted the royal titulary Tiberios Klaudios, Autokrator Heqaheqau Meryasetptah, Kanakht Djediakhshuemakhet ("Tiberius Claudius, Emperor and ruler of rulers, beloved of Isis and Ptah, the strong bull of the stable moon on the horizon").

While Claudius had never been formally adopted either by Augustus or his successors, he was nevertheless the grandson of Augustus's sister Octavia, and so he felt that he had the right of family. He also adopted the name "Augustus" as the two previous emperors had done at their accessions. He kept the honorific "Germanicus" to display the connection with his heroic brother. He deified his paternal grandmother Livia to highlight her position as wife of the divine Augustus. Claudius frequently used the term "filius Drusi" (son of Drusus) in his titles, to remind the people of his legendary father and lay claim to his reputation.

Since Claudius was the first emperor proclaimed on the initiative of the Praetorian Guard instead of the Senate, his repute suffered at the hands of commentators (such as Seneca). Moreover, he was the first emperor who resorted to bribery as a means to secure army loyalty and rewarded the soldiers of the Praetorian Guard that had elevated him with 15,000 sesterces. Tiberius and Augustus had both left gifts to the army and guard in their wills, and upon Caligula's death the same would have been expected, even if no will existed. Claudius remained grateful to the guard, however, issuing coins with tributes to the Praetorians in the early part of his reign.

Pliny the Elder noted, according to the 1938 Loeb Classical Library translation by Harris Rackham, "... many people do not allow any gems in a signet-ring, and seal with the gold itself; this was a fashion invented when Claudius Cæsar was emperor."

Claudius restored the status of the peaceful Imperial Roman provinces of Macedonia and Achaea as senatorial provinces.

Expansion of the Empire

Under Claudius, the Empire underwent its first major expansion since the reign of Augustus. The provinces of Thrace, Noricum, Lycia, and Judea were annexed (or put under direct rule) under various circumstances during his term. The annexation of Mauretania, begun under Caligula, was completed after the defeat of rebel forces, and the official division of the former client kingdom into two Imperial provinces. The most far-reaching conquest was that of Britannia.

In 43, Claudius sent Aulus Plautius with four legions to Britain (Britannia) after an appeal from an ousted tribal ally. Britain was an attractive target for Rome because of its material wealth – mines and slaves – as well as being a haven for Gallic rebels. Claudius himself traveled to the island after the completion of initial offensives, bringing with him reinforcements and elephants. The Roman colonia of Colonia Claudia Victricensis was established as the provincial capital of the newly established province of Britannia at Camulodunum, where a large temple was dedicated in his honour.

He left after 16 days, but remained in the provinces for some time. The Senate granted him a triumph for his efforts. Only members of the Imperial family were allowed such honours, but Claudius subsequently lifted this restriction for some of his conquering generals. He was granted the honorific "Britannicus" but only accepted it on behalf of his son, never using the title himself. When the British general Caractacus was captured in 50, Claudius granted him clemency. Caractacus lived out his days on land provided by the Roman state, an unusual end for an enemy commander.

Claudius conducted a census in 48 that found 5,984,072 (adult male) Roman citizens (women, children, slaves, and free adult males without Roman citizenship were not counted), an increase of around a million since the census conducted at Augustus's death. He had helped increase this number through the foundation of Roman colonies that were granted blanket citizenship. These colonies were often made out of existing communities, especially those with elites who could rally the populace to the Roman cause. Several colonies were placed in new provinces or on the border of the Empire to secure Roman holdings as quickly as possible.

Judicial and legislative affairs
Claudius personally judged many of the legal cases tried during his reign. Ancient historians have many complaints about this, stating that his judgments were variable and sometimes did not follow the law. He was also easily swayed. Nevertheless, Claudius paid detailed attention to the operation of the judicial system.

He extended the summer court session, as well as the winter term, by shortening the traditional breaks. Claudius also made a law requiring plaintiffs to remain in the city while their cases were pending, as defendants had previously been required to do. These measures had the effect of clearing out the docket. The minimum age for jurors was also raised to 25 to ensure a more experienced jury pool.

Claudius also settled disputes in the provinces. He freed the island of Rhodes from Roman rule for their good faith and exempted Ilium (Troy) from taxes. Early in his reign, the Greeks and Jews of Alexandria sent him two embassies at once after riots broke out between the two communities. This resulted in the famous "Letter to the Alexandrians", which reaffirmed Jewish rights in the city but also forbade them to move in more families en masse. According to Josephus, he then reaffirmed the rights and freedoms of all the Jews in the Empire.

One of Claudius's investigators discovered that many old Roman citizens based in the city of Tridentum (modern Trento) were not in fact citizens. The Emperor issued a declaration, contained in the Tabula clesiana, that they would be considered to hold citizenship from then on, since to strip them of their status would cause major problems. However, in individual cases, Claudius punished false assumption of citizenship harshly, making it a capital offense. Similarly, any freedmen found to be laying false claim to membership of the Roman equestrian order were sold back into slavery.

Numerous edicts were issued throughout Claudius's reign. These were on a number of topics, everything from medical advice to moral judgments. A famous medical example is one promoting yew juice as a cure for snakebite. Suetonius wrote that he is even said to have thought of an edict allowing public flatulence for good health. One of the more famous edicts concerned the status of sick slaves. Masters had been abandoning ailing slaves at the temple of Aesculapius on Tiber Island to die instead of providing them with medical assistance and care, and then reclaiming them if they lived. Claudius ruled that slaves who were thus abandoned and recovered after such treatment would be free. Furthermore, masters who chose to kill slaves rather than take care of them were liable to be charged with murder.

Public works

Claudius embarked on many public works throughout his reign, both in the capital and in the provinces. He built two aqueducts, the Aqua Claudia, begun by Caligula, and the Aqua Anio Novus. These entered the city in 52 and met at the Porta Maggiore. He also restored a third, the Aqua Virgo.

He paid special attention to transportation. Throughout Italy and the provinces he built roads and canals. Among these was a large canal leading from the Rhine to the sea, as well as a road from Italy to Germany – both begun by his father, Drusus. Closer to Rome, he built a navigable canal on the Tiber, leading to Portus, his new port just north of Ostia. This port was constructed in a semicircle with two moles and a lighthouse at its mouth. The construction also had the effect of reducing flooding in Rome.

The port at Ostia was part of Claudius's solution to the constant grain shortages that occurred in winter, after the Roman shipping season. The other part of his solution was to insure the ships of grain merchants who were willing to risk travelling to Egypt in the off-season. He also granted their sailors special privileges, including citizenship and exemption from the Lex Papia Poppaea, a law that regulated marriage. In addition, he repealed the taxes that Caligula had instituted on food, and further reduced taxes on communities suffering drought or famine.

The last part of Claudius's plan was to increase the amount of arable land in Italy. This was to be achieved by draining the Fucine lake, which would have the added benefit of making the nearby river navigable year-round.

A tunnel was dug through the lake bed, but the plan was a failure. The tunnel was crooked and not large enough to carry the water, which caused it to back up when opened. The resultant flood washed out a large gladiatorial exhibition held to commemorate the opening, causing Claudius to run for his life along with the other spectators. The draining of the lake continued to present a problem well into the Middle Ages. He expanded the Claudian tunnel to three times its original size.

Senate

Due to the circumstances of his accession, Claudius took great pains to please the Senate. During regular sessions, the Emperor sat among the Senate body, speaking in turn. When introducing a law, he sat on a bench between the consuls in his position as holder of the power of Tribune (the Emperor could not officially serve as a Tribune of the Plebes as he was a patrician, but it was a power taken by previous rulers). He refused to accept all his predecessors' titles (including Imperator) at the beginning of his reign, preferring to earn them in due course. He allowed the Senate to issue its own bronze coinage for the first time since Augustus. He also put the Imperial provinces of Macedonia and Achaea back under Senate control.

Claudius set about remodeling the Senate into a more efficient, representative body. He chided the senators about their reluctance to debate bills introduced by himself, as noted in the fragments of a surviving speech:

In 47, he assumed the office of censor with Lucius Vitellius, which had been allowed to lapse for some time. He struck the names of many senators and equites who no longer met qualifications, but showed respect by allowing them to resign in advance. At the same time, he sought to admit eligible men from the provinces. The Lyon Tablet preserves his speech on the admittance of Gallic senators, in which he addresses the Senate with reverence but also with criticism for their disdain of these men. He even jokes about how the Senate had admitted members from beyond Gallia Narbonensis (Lyons, France), i.e. himself.  He also increased the number of patricians by adding new families to the dwindling number of noble lines. Here he followed the precedent of Lucius Junius Brutus and Julius Caesar.

Nevertheless, many in the Senate remained hostile to Claudius, and many plots were made on his life. This hostility carried over into the historical accounts. As a result, Claudius reduced the Senate's power for the sake of efficiency. The administration of Ostia was turned over to an Imperial procurator after construction of the port. Administration of many of the empire's financial concerns was turned over to Imperial appointees and freedmen. This led to further resentment and suggestions that these same freedmen were ruling the Emperor.

Plots and coup attempts 
Several coup attempts were made during Claudius's reign, resulting in the deaths of many senators. Appius Silanus was executed early in Claudius's reign under questionable circumstances. Shortly after, a large rebellion was undertaken by the Senator Vinicianus and Scribonianus, the governor of Dalmatia, and gained quite a few senatorial supporters. It ultimately failed because of the reluctance of Scribonianus's troops, which led to the suicide of the main conspirators.

Many other senators tried different conspiracies and were condemned. Claudius's son-in-law Pompeius Magnus was executed for his part in a conspiracy with his father Crassus Frugi. Another plot involved the consulars Lusiius Saturninus, Cornelius Lupus, and Pompeius Pedo.

In 46, Asinius Gallus, the grandson of Asinius Pollio, and Titus Statilius Taurus Corvinus were exiled for a plot hatched with several of Claudius's own freedmen. Valerius Asiaticus was executed without public trial for unknown reasons. The ancient sources say the charge was adultery, and that Claudius was tricked into issuing the punishment. However, Claudius singles out Asiaticus for special damnation in his speech on the Gauls, which dates over a year later, suggesting that the charge must have been much more serious.

Asiaticus had been a claimant to the throne in the chaos following Caligula's death and a co-consul with the Titus Statilius Taurus Corvinus mentioned above. Most of these conspiracies took place before Claudius's term as Censor, and may have induced him to review the Senatorial rolls. The conspiracy of Gaius Silius in the year after his Censorship, 48, is detailed in book 11 of Tacitus Annal. This section of Tacitus history narrates the alleged conspiracy of Claudius's third wife, Messalina. Suetonius states that a total of 35 senators and 300 knights were executed for offenses during Claudius's reign. Needless to say, the responses to these conspiracies could not have helped Senate–emperor relations.

Secretariat and centralization of powers
Claudius was hardly the first emperor to use freedmen to help with the day-to-day running of the Empire. He was, however, forced to increase their role as the powers of the princeps became more centralized and the burden larger. This was partly due to the ongoing hostility of the Senate, as mentioned above, but also due to his respect for the senators. Claudius did not want free-born magistrates to have to serve under him, as if they were not peers.

The secretariat was divided into bureaus, with each being placed under the leadership of one freedman. Narcissus was the secretary of correspondence. Pallas became the secretary of the treasury. Callistus became secretary of justice. There was a fourth bureau for miscellaneous issues, which was put under Polybius until his execution for treason. The freedmen could also officially speak for the Emperor, as when Narcissus addressed the troops in Claudius's stead before the conquest of Britain.

Since these were important positions, the senators were aghast at their being placed in the hands of former slaves and "well-known eunuchs". If freedmen had total control of money, letters, and law, it seemed it would not be hard for them to manipulate the Emperor. This is exactly the accusation put forth by the ancient sources. However, these same sources admit that the freedmen were loyal to Claudius.

He was similarly appreciative of them and gave them due credit for policies where he had used their advice. However, if they showed treasonous inclinations, the Emperor did punish them with just force, as in the case of Polybius and Pallas's brother, Felix. There is no evidence that the character of Claudius's policies and edicts changed with the rise and fall of the various freedmen, suggesting that he was firmly in control throughout.

Regardless of the extent of their political power, the freedmen did manage to amass wealth through their positions. Pliny the Elder notes that several of them were richer than Crassus, the richest man of the Republican era.

Religious reforms

Claudius, as the author of a treatise on Augustus's religious reforms, felt himself in a good position to institute some of his own. He had strong opinions about the proper form for state religion. He refused the request of Alexandrian Greeks to dedicate a temple to his divinity, saying that only gods may choose new gods. He restored lost days to festivals and got rid of many extraneous celebrations added by Caligula. He re-instituted old observances and archaic language.

Claudius was concerned with the spread of eastern mysteries within the city and searched for more Roman replacements. He emphasized the Eleusinian Mysteries which had been practiced by so many during the Republic. He expelled foreign astrologers, and at the same time rehabilitated the old Roman soothsayers (known as haruspices) as a replacement. He was especially hard on Druidism, because of its incompatibility with the Roman state religion and its proselytizing activities.

Public games and entertainments
According to Suetonius, Claudius was extraordinarily fond of games. He is said to have risen with the crowd after gladiatorial matches and given unrestrained praise to the fighters. Claudius also presided over many new and original events. Soon after coming into power, Claudius instituted games to be held in honor of his father on the latter's birthday. Annual games were also held in honour of his accession, and took place at the Praetorian camp where Claudius had first been proclaimed Emperor.

Claudius organised a performance of the Secular Games, marking the 800th anniversary of the founding of Rome. Augustus had performed the same games less than a century prior. Augustus's excuse was that the interval for the games was 110 years, not 100, but his date actually did not qualify under either reasoning. Claudius also presented naval battles to mark the attempted draining of the Fucine Lake, as well as many other public games and shows.

At Ostia, in front of a crowd of spectators, Claudius fought an orca which was trapped in the harbour. The event was witnessed by Pliny the Elder:

Claudius also restored and adorned many public venues in Rome. At the Circus Maximus, the turning posts and starting stalls were replaced in marble and embellished, and an embankment was probably added to prevent flooding of the track. Claudius also reinforced or extended the seating rules that reserved front seating at the Circus for senators. He rebuilt Pompey's Theatre after it had been destroyed by fire, organising special fights at the re-dedication which he observed from a special platform in the orchestra box.

Marriages and personal life
Suetonius and the other ancient authors accused Claudius of being dominated by women and wives, and of being a womanizer.

Claudius married four times, after two failed betrothals. The first betrothal was to his distant cousin Aemilia Lepida, but was broken for political reasons. The second was to Livia Medullina Camilla, which ended with Medullina's sudden death on their wedding day.

Plautia Urgulanilla
Plautia Urgulanilla was the granddaughter of Livia's confidant Urgulania. During their marriage she gave birth to a son, Claudius Drusus. Drusus died of asphyxiation in his early teens, shortly after becoming engaged to Junilla, the daughter of Sejanus.

Claudius later divorced Urgulanilla for adultery and on suspicion of murdering her sister-in-law Apronia. When Urgulanilla gave birth after the divorce, Claudius repudiated the baby girl, Claudia, as the father was allegedly one of his own freedmen. This action made him later the target of criticism by his enemies.

Aelia Paetina
Soon after (possibly in 28), Claudius married Aelia Paetina, a relative of Sejanus, if not Sejanus's adoptive sister. During their marriage, Claudius and Paetina had a daughter, Claudia Antonia. He later divorced her after the marriage became a political liability, although Leon (1948) suggests it may have been due to emotional and mental abuse by Paetina.

Valeria Messalina

Some years after divorcing Aelia Paetina, in 38 or early 39, Claudius married Valeria Messalina, who was his first cousin once removed (Claudius's grandmother, Octavia the Younger, was Valeria's great-grandmother on both her mother and father's side) and closely allied with Caligula's circle. Shortly thereafter, she gave birth to a daughter, Claudia Octavia. A son, first named Tiberius Claudius Germanicus, and later known as Britannicus, was born just after Claudius's accession.

This marriage ended in tragedy. The ancient historians allege that Messalina was a nymphomaniac who was regularly unfaithful to Claudius—Tacitus states she went so far as to compete with a prostitute to see who could have more sexual partners in a nightand manipulated his policies to amass wealth. In 48, Messalina married her lover Gaius Silius in a public ceremony while Claudius was at Ostia.

Sources disagree as to whether or not she divorced the Emperor first, and whether the intention was to usurp the throne. Under Roman law, the spouse needed to be informed that he or she had been divorced before a new marriage could take place; the sources state that Claudius was in total ignorance until after the marriage. Scramuzza, in his biography, suggests that Silius may have convinced Messalina that Claudius was doomed, and the union was her only hope of retaining rank and protecting her children. The historian Tacitus suggests that Claudius's ongoing term as Censor may have prevented him from noticing the affair before it reached such a critical point. Whatever the case, the result was the execution of Silius, Messalina, and most of her circle.

Agrippina the Younger
Claudius did marry once more. The ancient sources tell that his freedmen put forward three candidates, Caligula's third wife Lollia Paulina, Claudius's divorced second wife Aelia Paetina and Claudius's niece Agrippina the Younger. According to Suetonius, Agrippina won out through her feminine wiles. She gradually seized power from Emperor Claudius and successfully conspired to eliminate his son's rivals and she was able to successfully open the way for her son to become emperor.

The truth is probably more political. The attempted coup d'état by Silius and Messalina had probably made Claudius realize the weakness of his position as a member of the Claudian but not the Julian family. This weakness was compounded by the fact that he did not yet have an obvious adult heir, Britannicus being just a boy.

Agrippina was one of the few remaining descendants of Augustus, and her son Lucius Domitius Ahenobarbus (the future Emperor Nero) was one of the last males of the Imperial family. Coup attempts could rally around the pair and Agrippina was already showing such ambition. It has been suggested that the Senate may have pushed for the marriage, to end the feud between the Julian and Claudian branches. This feud dated back to Agrippina's mother's actions against Tiberius after the death of her husband Germanicus (Claudius's brother), actions which Tiberius had gladly punished. In any case, Claudius accepted Agrippina and later adopted the newly mature Nero as his son.

Nero was married to Claudius's daughter Octavia, made joint heir with the underage Britannicus, and promoted; Augustus had similarly named his grandson Postumus Agrippa and his stepson Tiberius as joint heirs, and Tiberius had named Caligula joint heir with his grandson Tiberius Gemellus. Adoption of adults or near adults was an old tradition in Rome, when a suitable natural adult heir was unavailable as was the case during Britannicus's minority. Claudius may have previously looked to adopt one of his sons-in-law to protect his own reign.

Faustus Cornelius Sulla Felix, who was married to Claudius's daughter Claudia Antonia, was only descended from Octavia and Antony on one side – not close enough to the Imperial family to prevent doubts (although that did not stop others from making him the object of a coup attempt against Nero a few years later). Besides which, he was the half-brother of Valeria Messalina and at this time those wounds were still fresh. Nero was more popular with the general public as the grandson of Germanicus and the direct descendant of Augustus.

Affliction and personality

The historian Suetonius describes the physical manifestations of Claudius's condition in relatively good detail. His knees were weak and gave way under him and his head shook. He stammered and his speech was confused. He slobbered and his nose ran when he was excited. The Stoic Seneca states in his Apocolocyntosis that Claudius's voice belonged to no land animal, and that his hands were weak as well.

However, he showed no physical deformity, as Suetonius notes that when calm and seated he was a tall, well-built figure of dignitas. When angered or stressed, his symptoms became worse. Historians agree that this condition improved upon his accession to the throne. Claudius himself claimed that he had exaggerated his ailments to save his life.

Modern assessments of his health have changed several times in the past century. Prior to World War II, infantile paralysis (or polio) was widely accepted as the cause. This is the diagnosis used in Robert Graves's Claudius novels, first published in the 1930s. Polio does not explain many of the described symptoms, however, and a more recent theory implicates cerebral palsy as the cause, as outlined by Ernestine Leon. Tourette syndrome has also been considered a possibility.

As a person, ancient historians described Claudius as generous and lowbrow, a man who sometimes lunched with the plebeians. They also paint him as bloodthirsty and cruel, over-fond of gladiatorial combat and executions, and very quick to anger; Claudius himself acknowledged the latter trait, and apologized publicly for his temper. According to the ancient historians he was also excessively trusting, and easily manipulated by his wives and freedmen. But at the same time they portray him as paranoid and apathetic, dull and easily confused.

Claudius's extant works present a different view, painting a picture of an intelligent, scholarly, well-read, and conscientious administrator with an eye to detail and justice. Thus, Claudius becomes an enigma. Since the discovery of his "Letter to the Alexandrians" in the last century, much work has been done to rehabilitate Claudius and determine where the truth lies.

Scholarly works and their impact
Claudius wrote copiously throughout his life. Arnaldo Momigliano states that during the reign of Tiberius – which covers the peak of Claudius's literary career – it became impolitic to speak of republican Rome. The trend among the young historians was to either write about the new empire or obscure antiquarian subjects. Claudius was the rare scholar who covered both.

Besides the history of Augustus's reign that caused him so much grief, his major works included Tyrrhenica, a twenty-book Etruscan history, and Carchedonica, an eight-volume history of Carthage, as well as an Etruscan dictionary. He also wrote a book on dice-playing.  Despite the general avoidance of the Republican era, he penned a defense of Cicero against the charges of Asinius Gallus. Modern historians have used this to determine the nature of his politics and of the aborted chapters of his civil war history.

He proposed a reform of the Latin alphabet by the addition of three new letters. He officially instituted the change during his censorship but they did not survive his reign. Claudius also tried to revive the old custom of putting dots between successive words (Classical Latin was written with no spacing). Finally, he wrote an eight-volume autobiography that Suetonius describes as lacking in taste. Claudius (like most of the members of his dynasty) harshly criticized his predecessors and relatives in surviving speeches.

None of the works survive but live on as sources for the surviving histories of the Julio-Claudian dynasty. Suetonius quotes Claudius's autobiography once and must have used it as a source numerous times. Tacitus uses Claudius's arguments for the orthographical innovations mentioned above and may have used him for some of the more antiquarian passages in his annals. Claudius is the source for numerous passages of Pliny's Natural History.

The influence of historical study on Claudius is obvious. In his speech on Gallic senators, he uses a version of the founding of Rome identical to that of Livy, his tutor in adolescence. The speech is meticulous in details, a common mark of all his extant works, and he goes into long digressions on related matters. This indicates a deep knowledge of a variety of historical subjects that he could not but share. Many of the public works instituted in his reign were based on plans first suggested by Julius Caesar. Levick believes this emulation of Caesar may have spread to all aspects of his policies.

His censorship seems to have been based on those of his ancestors, particularly Appius Claudius Caecus, and he used the office to put into place many policies based on those of Republican times. This is when many of his religious reforms took effect, and his building efforts greatly increased during his tenure. In fact, his assumption of the office of Censor may have been motivated by a desire to see his academic labors bear fruit. For example, he believed (as most Romans did) that Caecus had used the censorship to introduce the letter "R" and so used his own term to introduce his new letters.

Death

The consensus of ancient historians was that Claudius was murdered by poison – possibly contained in mushrooms or on a feather – and died in the early hours of 13 October 54.

Nearly all implicate his final and powerful wife, Agrippina, as the instigator. Agrippina and Claudius had become more combative in the months leading up to his death. This carried on to the point where Claudius openly lamented his bad wives, and began to comment on Britannicus' approaching manhood with an eye towards restoring his status within the imperial family. Agrippina had motive in ensuring the succession of Nero before Britannicus could gain power.

Some implicate either his taster Halotus, his doctor Xenophon, or the infamous poisoner Locusta as the administrator of the fatal substance. Some say he died after prolonged suffering following a single dose at dinner, and some have him recovering only to be poisoned again. Among contemporary sources, Seneca the Younger ascribed the emperor's death to natural causes, while Josephus only spoke of rumors on his poisoning.

Some historians have cast doubt on whether Claudius was murdered or merely died from illness or old age. Evidence against his murder include his old age, his serious illnesses in his last years, his unhealthy lifestyle and the fact that his taster Halotus continued to serve in the same position under Nero. On the other hand, some modern scholars claim the near universality of the accusations in ancient texts lends credence to the crime. Claudius's ashes were interred in the Mausoleum of Augustus on 24 October 54, after a funeral similar to that of his great-uncle Augustus 40 years earlier.

Legacy

Divine honours
Already, while alive, he received the widespread private worship of a living princeps and was worshipped in Britannia in his own temple in Camulodunum.

Claudius was deified by Nero and the Senate almost immediately.

Views of the new regime
Agrippina had sent away Narcissus shortly before Claudius's death, and now murdered the freedman. The last act of this secretary of letters was to burn all of Claudius's correspondence – most likely so it could not be used against him and others in an already hostile new regime. Thus Claudius's private words about his own policies and motives were lost to history. Just as Claudius had criticized his predecessors in official edicts (see below), Nero often criticized the deceased Emperor and many Claudian laws and edicts were disregarded under the reasoning that he was too stupid and senile to have meant them.

Seneca's Apocolocyntosis mocks the deification of Claudius and reinforces the view of Claudius as an unpleasant fool; this remained the official view for the duration of Nero's reign. Eventually Nero stopped referring to his deified adoptive father at all, and realigned with his birth family. Claudius's temple was left unfinished after only some of the foundation had been laid down. Eventually the site was overtaken by Nero's Golden House.

Flavian and later perspectives
The Flavians, who had risen to prominence under Claudius, took a different tack. They were in a position where they needed to shore up their legitimacy, but also justify the fall of the Julio-Claudians. They reached back to Claudius in contrast with Nero, to show that they were good associated with good. Commemorative coins were issued of Claudius and his son Britannicus, who had been a friend of the Emperor Titus (Titus was born in 39, Britannicus was born in 41). When Nero's Golden House was burned, the Temple of Claudius was finally completed on the Caelian Hill.

However, as the Flavians became established, they needed to emphasize their own credentials more, and their references to Claudius ceased. Instead, he was lumped with the other emperors of the fallen dynasty. His state cult in Rome probably continued until the abolition of all such cults of dead Emperors by Maximinus Thrax in 237–238. The Feriale Duranum, probably identical to the festival calendars of every regular army unit, assigns him a sacrifice of a steer on his birthday, the Kalends of August. And such commemoration (and consequent feasting) probably continued until the Christianization and disintegration of the army in the late 4th century.

Views of ancient historians
The ancient historians Tacitus, Suetonius (in The Twelve Caesars), and Cassius Dio all wrote after the last of the Flavians had gone. All three were senators or equites. They took the side of the Senate in most conflicts with the Princeps, invariably viewing him as being in the wrong. This resulted in biases, both conscious and unconscious. Suetonius lost access to the official archives shortly after beginning his work. He was forced to rely on second-hand accounts when it came to Claudius (with the exception of Augustus's letters, which had been gathered earlier). Suetonius painted Claudius as a ridiculous figure, belittling many of his acts and attributing the objectively good works to his retinue.

Tacitus wrote a narrative for his fellow senators and fitted each of the emperors into a simple mold of his choosing. He wrote of Claudius as a passive pawn and an idiot in affairs relating to the palace and often in public life. During his censorship of 47–48 Tacitus allows the reader a glimpse of a Claudius who is more statesmanlike (XI.23–25), but it is a mere glimpse. Tacitus is usually held to have 'hidden' his use of Claudius's writings and to have omitted Claudius's character from his works. Even his version of Claudius's Lyons tablet speech is edited to be devoid of the Emperor's personality. Dio was less biased, but seems to have used Suetonius and Tacitus as sources. Thus, the conception of Claudius as the weak fool, controlled by those he supposedly ruled, was preserved for the ages.

As time passed, Claudius was mostly forgotten outside of the historians's accounts. His books were lost first, as their antiquarian subjects became unfashionable. In the 2nd century, Pertinax, who shared his birthday, became emperor, overshadowing commemoration of Claudius.

In modern media
 The best known fictional representation of the Emperor Claudius was contained in the books I, Claudius and Claudius the God (published in 1934 and 1935, respectively) by Robert Graves, both written in the first-person to give the reader the impression that they are Claudius's autobiography. Graves employed a fictive artifice to suggest that they were recently discovered, genuine translations of Claudius's writings. Claudius's extant letters, speeches, and sayings were incorporated into the text (mostly in the second book, Claudius the God), to add authenticity.
 In 1937, director Josef von Sternberg attempted a film version of I, Claudius, with Charles Laughton as Claudius. However, the lead actress, Merle Oberon, had a near-fatal car accident and the movie was never finished. The surviving reels were featured in the BBC documentary The Epic That Never Was (1965). The motion picture rights for a new film eventually passed to producer Scott Rudin.
 Graves's two books were the basis for a British television adaptation I, Claudius, produced by the BBC. The series starred Derek Jacobi as Claudius and was broadcast in 1976 on BBC2. It was a substantial critical success, and won several BAFTA awards. The series was later broadcast in the United States on Masterpiece Theatre in 1977. The 1996 7-VHS release and the later DVD release of the television series, include The Epic That Never Was documentary.
 A radio adaptation of the Graves novels by Robin Brooks and directed by Jonquil Panting, was broadcast in six one-hour episodes on BBC Radio 4 beginning 4 December 2010. The cast featured Tom Goodman-Hill as Claudius, Derek Jacobi as Augustus, Harriet Walter as Livia, Tim McInnerny as Tiberius and Samuel Barnett as Caligula.
 In 2011, it was announced rights for a miniseries adaptation passed to HBO and BBC Two.  Anne Thomopoulos and Jane Tranter, producers of the popular HBO–BBC2 Rome miniseries, were attached to the I, Claudius project.  However, as of 2018, it has yet to be produced, and no release date is pending.
 The 1954 film Demetrius and the Gladiators also portrayed him sympathetically, played by Barry Jones.
 In the 1960 film Messalina, Claudius is portrayed by Mino Doro.
 On television, Freddie Jones portrayed Claudius in the 1968 British television series The Caesars.
 The 1975 TV Special Further Up Pompeii! (based on the Frankie Howerd sit-com Up Pompeii!) featured Cyril Appleton as Claudius.
 In the 1979 motion picture Caligula, where the role was performed by Giancarlo Badessi, Claudius is depicted as an idiot, in contrast to Robert Graves' portrait of Claudius as a cunning and deeply intelligent man, who is perceived by others to be an idiot.
 In the 1981 Franco-Italian film Caligula and Messalina, he was portrayed by Gino Turini (as John Turner).
 The 1985 made-for-television miniseries A.D. features actor Richard Kiley as Claudius.  Kiley portrays him as thoughtful, but willing to cater to public opinion as well as being under the influence of Agrippina.
 In the 2004 TV film Imperium: Nero, Claudius is portrayed by Massimo Dapporto.
 He is portrayed in Season 3 of the Netflix documentary series Roman Empire, which focused on the reign of Caligula, by Kelson Henderson. The series concludes with Claudius's accession.
 There is also a reference to Claudius's suppression of a coup in the movie Gladiator, though the incident is entirely fictional.
 In the series Britannia (2018), Claudius visits Britannia, played by Steve Pemberton as a fool who is drugged by Aulus Plautius.
 He is portrayed by Derek Jacobi in the 2019 BBC film Horrible Histories: The Movie - Rotten Romans

In literature, Claudius and his contemporaries appear in the historical novel The Roman by Mika Waltari. Canadian-born science fiction writer A. E. van Vogt reimagined Robert Graves's Claudius story, in his two novels, Empire of the Atom and The Wizard of Linn.

The historical novel Chariot of the Soul by Linda Proud features Claudius as host and mentor of the young Togidubnus, son of King Verica of the Atrebates, during his ten-year stay in Rome. When Togidubnus returns to Britain in advance of the Roman army, it is with a mission given to him by Claudius.

See also
 Julio-Claudian family tree
 List of Roman emperors
 Temple of Claudius

Notes

References

Bibliography

 Baldwin, B. (1964). "Executions under Claudius: Seneca's Ludus de Morte Claudii". Phoenix 18 (1): 39–48. 
 Griffin, M. (1990). "Claudius in Tacitus". Classical Quarterly 40 (2): 482–501. 
 
 Levick, B.M. (1978). "Claudius: Antiquarian or Revolutionary?" American Journal of Philology, 99 (1): 79–105.
 
 Leon, E.F. (1948). "The Imbecillitas of the Emperor Claudius", Transactions and Proceedings of the American Philological Association, 79  79–86.
 McAlindon, D. (1957). "Claudius and the Senators", American Journal of Philology, 78 (3):  279–286.
 Major, A. (1992). "Was He Pushed or Did He Leap? Claudius' Ascent to Power", Ancient History, 22 25–31.
 Malloch, S. J. V. (2013). The Annals of Tacitus, book 11. Cambridge University Press.
  Minaud, Gérard, Les vies de 12 femmes d'empereur romain – Devoirs, Intrigues & Voluptés, Paris, L'Harmattan, 2012, ch. 2,  La vie de Messaline, femme de Claude, p. 39–64; ch. 3,  La vie d'Agrippine, femme de Claude, p. 65–96. .
 Momigliano, Arnaldo (1934). Claudius: the Emperor and His Achievement Trans. W.D. Hogarth. Cambridge: W. Heffer and Sons.
 Oost, S.V. (1958). "The Career of M. Antonius Pallas", American Journal of Philology, 79 (2): 113–139.
 
 Renucci, Pierre (2012). Claude, l'empereur inattendu, Paris: Perrin. 
 
 Ryan, F.X. (1993). "Some Observations on the Censorship of Claudius and Vitellius, AD 47–48", American Journal of Philology, 114 (4):  611–618.
 Scramuzza, Vincent (1940). The Emperor Claudius Cambridge: Harvard University Press.
 
 
 
 
 Vessey, D.W.T.C. (1971). "Thoughts on Tacitus' Portrayal of Claudius" American Journal of Philology 92 (3) 385–409.

External links

Ancient sources
 Suetonius
 Life of Claudius
 Tacitus
 Tacitus, books 11–12
 Dio
 Cassius Dio's account of Claudius' reign, part I
 Cassius Dio's account, part II
 Josephus
 The works of Josephus
 Seneca
 The Apocolocyntosis of the Divine Claudius
 Claudius
 Claudius' Letter to the Alexandrians
 Lyons tablet
 Extract from first half of the Lyons Tablet
 Second half of the Lyons Tablet
 Tacitus' version of the Lyons Tablet speech
 Edict confirming the rights of the people of Trent. Full Latin text here.

Modern biographies
 Biography from De Imperatoribus Romanis
  Claudius Page
 Claudius I at BBC History

 
10 BC births
54 deaths
1st-century Gallo-Roman people
1st-century historians
1st-century murdered monarchs
1st-century Roman emperors
Ancient Romans in Britain
Claudii Nerones
Creators of writing systems
Husbands of Agrippina the Younger
Deified Roman emperors
Imperial Roman consuls
Julio-Claudian dynasty
Latin historians
People from Lugdunum
People with cerebral palsy
Poisoned Romans
Royalty and nobility with disabilities
Roman pharaohs
Murdered Roman emperors